William Joseph McDonald (June 17, 1904 – January 7, 1989) was an Irish-born bishop of the Catholic Church in the United States. He served as an auxiliary bishop of the Archdiocese of Washington from 1964 to 1967 and the Archdiocese of San Francisco in California from 1967 to 1979.

Biography
William McDonald was born on June 17, 1904, in Kilkenny in County Kilkenny,  United Kingdom of Great Britain and Ireland. He trained for the priesthood in St Kieran's College in Kilkenny.

McDonald was ordained a priest in San Francisco for the Archdiocese of San Francisco on June 10, 1928, and served as a parish priest before entering the academic field. He received a master's degree and then doctorate from The Catholic University of America (CUA) in Washington, D.C. where he remained as a professor.  From 1957 to 1967, McDonald served as rector of CUA, the last person to hold that title before it was changed to president. From 1960 to 1963,  McDonald served as president of the International Federation of Catholic Universities and editor of the New Catholic Encyclopedia.

Auxiliary Bishop of Washington 
On March 17, 1964 Pope Paul VI appointed McDonald as the titular bishop of Aquae Regiae and as an auxiliary bishop of Washington.  He was consecrated a bishop by Archbishop Egidio Vagnozzi on May 19, 1964. The principal co-consecrators were Archbishops Patrick O'Boyle and Joseph McGucken.  McDonald attended the third and fourth sessions of the Second Vatican Council in Rome in 1964 and 1965.

Auxiliary Bishop of San Francisco 
Paul VI appointed McDonald on July 26, 1967, as an auxiliary bishop of the Archdiocese of San Francisco.  His resignation as auxiliary bishop was accepted by Pope John Paul II on June 5, 1979.

William McDonald died of a heart attack in San Francisco on January 7, 1989, at the age of 84.

References

1904 births
1989 deaths
People from Kilkenny (city)
Irish emigrants to the United States
Catholic University of America alumni
Catholic University of America faculty
Roman Catholic Archdiocese of San Francisco
Roman Catholic Archdiocese of Washington
20th-century American Roman Catholic titular bishops
Participants in the Second Vatican Council
Roman Catholic bishops in Washington, D.C.
Presidents of the Catholic University of America
20th-century American academics